Permanent Roommates is an Indian romantic comedy web series produced by The Viral Fever Media Labs. It was created by Arunabh Kumar, the founder of TVF, who also worked as the executive producer of the series. Written and developed by Biswapati Sarkar along with Sameer Saxena, the series is directed by Saxena and Deepak Kumar Mishra. Starring Sumeet Vyas and Nidhi Singh, this series revolves around a young couple, Tanya and Mikesh, who after being in a long distance relationship for three years, face the prospect of marriage.

Permanent Roommates marked India's first web series to be released. The first season consisting of five episodes, had its premiere on YouTube on 31 October 2014 and ended on 12 December 2014. After the reception of the first season, the makers renewed a second season for the series, which eventually was broadcast on The Viral Fever's premium online video streaming medium, TVF Play, on 14 February 2016 and ended on 24 June 2016.

The Viral Fever (TVF) and Aha have jointly produced the remake version of Permanent Roommates in Telugu as CommitMental.

Plot

Permanent Roommates follows the story of commitment-wary Tanya, and Mikesh, her overeager long-distance boyfriend who returns to India from the US to surprise Tanya and to ask her to marry him. Acting upon the advice of her roommate and her own reluctance to marry someone who barely knows her, Tanya refuses, but gives in to Mikesh's persistence. The two eventually strike a compromise, opting to move in together first. The subsequent events- a fallout, followed by a conciliation, and Tanya's premarital pregnancy end in the two of them planning their wedding, with unforeseen consequences.

Cast and characters

Main cast

 Sumeet Vyas as Mikesh Chaudhary
 Nidhi Singh as Tanya Nagpal
 Rohit Sukhwani as Rohit
 Deepak Kumar Mishra as Purushottam
 Shishir Sharma as Brijmohan Nagpal, father of Tanya
 Asrani as Subhash Chaudhary, paternal grandfather of Mikesh
 Sheeba Chaddha as Lata Chaudhary, mother of Mikesh
 Darshan Jariwala as Mohanlal Chaudhary, father of Mikesh
 Ayesha Raza Mishra as Ila, Tanya's maternal aunt
 Manu Rishi as twin Dr. Mudhit, brother of Mikesh's mother
 Anandeshwar Dwivedi as Laxman/LLeo

Guests

Introduced in Season 1

 Jitendra Kumar as Pathik, childhood friend of Mikesh.
 Akanksha Thakur as Rashmi, fiancé of Pathik.
 Sameer Saxena as Bansal, landlord of Ritu and Tanya's house.
 Nidhi Bisht as Ritu
 Sudhir Chobeesy as Atul Choubey, the registrar

Introduced in Season 2

 Divyendu Sharma as Agnivesh Chhabra
 Ratnabali Bhattacharjee as Seema Khatri
 Maanvi Gagroo as Shivani Chhabra
 Pradhuman Singh as Hemant
 Rasika Dugal as Avantika
 Anant Singh as Bulla

Episodes

Season 1 (2014)

Season 2 (2016)

Soundtrack 
The series' original soundtrack album is composed, written and performed by Vaibhav Bundhoo, which marked their first collaboration with The Viral Fever. Followed by the success of the Permanent Roommates, Bundhoo who worked as the composer and cinematographer of the series was also hired for other projects of TVF, as well as the second season of the series.

Season 1

Season 2

Permanent Roommates: He Said, She Said 
In March 2020, a 20-episode audio-book series titled Permanent Roommates: He Said, She Said was made available on Audible Suno (Indian version of the Amazon-owned Audible), with the original lead cast Sumeet Vyas and Nidhi Singh returning to voice their characters. The episodes  bridge the story between the two seasons focusing on the lives of Mikesh and Tanya when they moved in together.

Release and reception 
Permanent Roommates has been well received by the audience. The first episode, which premiered on 31 October 2014, has more than 4.5 million views. The series hosted on TVF's official YouTube channel, has since gathered over 1 million views for each episode. After the reception of the series, the makers unveiled the second season of the series through TVF's newly launched online platform TVF Play on 14 February 2016, which ended on 24 June 2016. On 6 October 2017, the series' dubbed Tamil version was released through TVF Machi, the media's first regional platform, with the first season being released.

Remake 
In 2019, The Viral Fever (TVF) announced their foray into Telugu market, with the remake of this series in the language. It further announced that they will produce the remake along with Aha by naming the web series as CommitMental.  Popular YouTuber Udhbav Raghunanda and film actress Punarnavi Bhupalam were taken as lead actors and the series is directed by Sadineni Pavan. It was released on 13 November 2020.

References

External links
 

Indian drama web series
YouTube original programming
2014 web series debuts
Hindi-language web series
TVF Play Shows
2010s YouTube series